Valeria Petrova (born 22 February 1996) is an Estonian table tennis player. Her highest career ITTF ranking was 233.

References

1996 births
Living people
Estonian female table tennis players